Zai Bennett (born 1974) is a television executive.  He is the director of Sky Atlantic and former controller of BBC Three.

Early life 
Zai Bennett was educated at Goffs School, Hertfordshire and studied History and Politics BA and Modern History MA at the University of London.

Career
Zai Bennett started his career in 1995 in the post room at Carlton Television, then worked as presentation scheduler for the launch of Channel 5 in 1997. He worked for ITV from 1998 in a number of roles including Head of Programme Strategy, ITV Digital Channels and ITV2 Programming and Acquisitions Manager. He was Controller of ITV2 from 2006 to 2009. In April 2010 he was appointed ITV's Director of Digital Channels and Acquisitions, where he was responsible for overseeing editorial content on ITV's digital channels (ITV2, ITV3, ITV4 and the CITV channel), including all commissioning and scheduling across the channels. In December 2010 the BBC announced he would become Controller of BBC Three in 2011.

In April 2014, after it was announced that BBC Three would become an online-only service, Bennett revealed he would be joining Sky Atlantic as the channel's director.

References 

BBC executives
BBC Three controllers
Living people
1974 births